The 1993 African Cup of Champions Clubs was the 29th edition of the annual international club football competition held in the CAF region (Africa), the African Cup of Champions Clubs. It determined that year's club champion of association football in Africa.

Zamalek SC from Egypt won that final, and became for the third time CAF club champion.

Preliminary round

|}
1 Bata Bullets, Étoile Filante (Lomé), Buffles du Borgou FC and Sporting Bissau all withdrew.

First round

|}
1 Black Aces and US Bilombe both withdrew. 
2 LPRC Oilers were ejected from the competition and fined $3,000 after Liberian immigration officials refused the Club Africain team for the first leg entry into the country.

Second round

|}

Quarter-finals

|}
1 SC Villa withdrew on the morning of the 2nd leg; they were banned from CAF competitions for two years.

Semi-finals

|}

Final

Champion

*Zamalek keep the trophy forever.

Top scorers

The top scorers from the 1993 African Cup of Champions Clubs are as follows:

References
RSSSF.com

1993 in African football
African Cup of Champions Clubs